ZALET (stylised as ZA*73T) are a collection of events occurring in Zaječar, Serbia, as a need to initiate, organize and support cultural events, to affirm artists and to intermediate in transmission of diverse artistic expressions and tendencies. Besides organizing pseudo-classical manifestations such as exhibitions, concerts, poetic evenings etc., the accent is put on innovative and progressive artistic expressions: performances, comics, low-fi videos, video art, conceptual art, as well as a union of traditional fine art and conceptual art.

History
The first ZALET was held in 2005. In the past five years the festival has hosted more than 300 artists. ZALET organized 27 exhibitions, 2 theatric performances, 14 murals, 6 poetic evenings, 11 performances. 34 bands played at the festival. There were also 8 showings of short films.

References

External links
 
 Saša Marković Mikrob about ZALET Fest '06

Music festivals in Serbia
Zaječar
Music festivals established in 2005